Bursosaphia is a genus of acoels belonging to the family Isodiametridae.

Species:
 Bursosaphia baltalimaniaformis Dörjes, 1968

References

Acoelomorphs